Mucuna sanjappae is a perennial woody twiner from the family Fabaceae. It is endemic to India (Maharashtra), having been recorded from Junnar in Maharashtra.

References

sanjappae
Flora of India (region)